Brachystephanus giganteus is a species of plant in the family Acanthaceae. It is found in Cameroon and Equatorial Guinea. Its natural habitat is subtropical or tropical moist montane forests.

References

giganteus
Vulnerable plants
Taxonomy articles created by Polbot